Verkhny Izyak (Ürge İźäk; , Küšyl Üzek) is a rural locality (a selo) and the administrative centre of Izyaksky Selsoviet, Blagoveshchensky District, Bashkortostan, Russia. The population was 558 as of 2010. There are 9 streets.

Geography 
Verkhny Izyak is located 27 km southeast of Blagoveshchensk (the district's administrative centre) by road. Tornovka is the nearest rural locality.

References 

Rural localities in Blagoveshchensky District